Massa Ranghar, formally Ranghar, also known by his birth name Musalal Khan was the Ranghar choudhary of Mandiala. In 1738, Qazi Abdul Razzaq was killed in an encounter with the Sikhs under Nawab Kapur Singh. The Governor of Lahore Zakariya Khan Bahadur, appointed Massa Ranghar as the commandant of Amritsar. He used the precincts of the Golden Temple for amusement with dancing girls.

The news of this sacrilegious use of the temple spread to the remote areas. Two Sikhs, Sukha Singh and Mehtab Singh, decided to kill Massa Ranghar. They disguised themselves as tax collectors, entered the temple and beheaded Massa Ranghar while he was enjoying the dance. 

Massa Ranghar met his end at the hands of Mehtab Singh.

References

Sikh Empire
Indian Sikhs
Ranghar